Bikbulatovo (Bikbulat) is a rural locality (a village) and the administrative centre of Uralsky Selsoviet, Kugarchinsky District, Bashkortostan, Russia. The population was 497 as of 2010. There are 8 streets.

Geography 
Bikbulatovo is located 13 km east of Mrakovo (the district's administrative centre) by road. Kuzminovka is the nearest rural locality.

References 

Rural localities in Kugarchinsky District